Hans Lycklama (born 1 October 1955) is a retired Dutch rower and rowing coach who won four medals at the World Lightweight Rowing Championships from 1974 to 1979 in the coxless four and coxed eight. He currently coaches the Dutch national team, including Rianne Sigmond, Maaike Head, Ilse Paulis and Anne Fischer.

References

 

1955 births
Living people
Dutch male rowers
Rowing coaches
Erasmus University Rotterdam alumni
World Rowing Championships medalists for the Netherlands